was a Japanese politician. He was the mayor of Iwata, Shizuoka. He died in August 2012 of natural causes at the age of 100.

References

1911 births
2012 deaths
Japanese centenarians
Japanese politicians
Mayors of places in Shizuoka Prefecture
Men centenarians